An Islamic Utopian: A Political Biography of Ali Shariati is a 1998 book by Ali Rahnema in which the author examines the life and works of Ali Shariati. It has been translated into Persian, Arabic, Turkish and Indonesian. This book is the first close study of Ali Shariati in English.

Reception
The book has already received positive reviews by Donna Robinson Divine, Vanessa Martin and Behrooz Ghamari‐Tabrizi

References

External links 
 An Islamic Utopian

1998 non-fiction books
2000 non-fiction books
English-language books
Iranian biographies
Books about politics of Iran
Bloomsbury Publishing books
Works about Ali Shariati
I.B. Tauris books